Abala  is a district in the Plateaux Region of central Republic of the Congo. The capital lies at Abala.

Towns and villages

References

Plateaux Department (Republic of the Congo)
Districts of the Republic of the Congo